Amblyseius adjaricus is a species of mite in the family Phytoseiidae.

References

adjaricus
Articles created by Qbugbot
Animals described in 1972